"Des mots invincibles" is a song by French pop-R&B singer-songwriter Leslie.

It was written by Bourgoin, Aurélien Mazin, and Siméo; with Siméo and DJ Kore handling the production. The song was released by Play On on June 4, 2012 as the first single from Bourgoin's fifth album, Les enfants de l'orage (2012).

Track listings
Digital download
 "Des mots invincibles" – 2:57

Digital remix single
 "Des mots invincibles" (featuring Youssoupha) – 2:57

Charts

Charts

References

2012 songs
Leslie (singer) songs
Songs written by Leslie (singer)

fr: